Heptagenia elegantula is a species of flatheaded mayfly in the family Heptageniidae. It is found in Central America, North America. In North America its range includes all of Canada, northern Mexico, and the continental United States.

References

Mayflies
Articles created by Qbugbot
Insects described in 1885